Charles Dera (born December 21, 1978) is an American pornographic actor, stripper, and model.

Early life
Dera was born in Philadelphia on December 21, 1978. He served in the Marines before working as a Chippendales dancer.

Career

In 2005, Dera was named Playgirl magazine's Man of the Year. He has appeared in 313 films for the production company Brazzers, as well as many Reality Kings movies. He has appeared in over 1,100 videos throughout his pornographic career. He also performed as "The Veteran" in the male strip troupe Men of the Strip. In 2016, he played the role of "Donald Drumpf" alongside Cherie DeVille as "Hillary Clayton" in the parody ZZ Erection for Brazzers. Dera received the XBIZ Award for Best Actor in 2018.

Personal life
Dera resides in Orange County, California.

Dera practices jiu-jitsu, training on and off since the early 2000s. He trained under fellow Chippendales dancer and professional middleweight Mike Foland, and has an MMA record of five matches (two wins, two losses, one draw).

Filmography

Mixed martial arts record

|-
| Loss
|align=center|2-2-1
|Alan Shook
|Decision (unanimous)
|NFAMMA - MMA at the Hyatt 3: Redemption
|
|align=center|3
|align=center|3:00
|Westlake Village, California
|align=center rowspan=5|
|-
| Win
|align=center|2-1-1
|Shaun Gutridge
|Decision (unanimous)
|TFA 16 - Battle in the Bullring
|
|align=center|3
|align=center|3:00
|Artesia, California
|-
| Win
|align=center|1-1-1
|Yusef Lewis
|Decision (unanimous)
|NFAMMA - MMA at the Hyatt 2
|
|align=center|3
|align=center|3:00
|Westlake Village, California
|-
| Loss
|align=center|0-1-1
|Nate Moore
|Submission (armbar)
|NFAMMA - MMA at the Hyatt 
|
|align=center|1
|align=center|2:48
|Westlake Village, California
|-
|Draw
|align=center|0-0-1
|Amos Sotelo
|Draw
|DH 4 - Desert Heat 4
|
|align=center|3
|align=center|5:00
|Phoenix, Arizona

Awards and nominations

References

External links

 

 
MixedMartialArts.com - Charles Dera
Charles Dera at Adult Video News

Male models from Philadelphia
Male actors from Philadelphia
1978 births
Living people
American male pornographic film actors
American male erotic dancers
American male mixed martial artists
Mixed martial artists utilizing jujutsu
American jujutsuka
United States Marines